Lysithea can refer to a few different things:

 Lysithea (alga), a genus of red algae in the family Bangiaceae
 Lysithea (moon), a moon of Jupiter
 Lysithea (mythology), a figure in Greek mythology
 Lysithea, a fictional spacecraft carrier in Voices of a Distant Star
 Lysithea von Ordelia, a fictional character from the video game Fire Emblem: Three Houses

See also
 Cosmopterix lysithea, a species of moth